A mythical national championship (sometimes abbreviated MNC) is national championship recognition that is not explicitly competitive. This phrase has often been invoked in reference to American college football, because the NCAA does not sponsor a playoff-style tournament or recognize official national champions for the Football Bowl Subdivision. The relevant recognition before 1998 came from various entities, including coach polls and media ballots, which each voted to recognize their own national champions, and is similar to the newspaper decision used in early boxing matches. The contrary term would be an undisputed national championship.

College football

"Mythical national champion" is a term that has been used since at least 1920 for a championship won by an NCAA Division I football team, especially for titles won before the Bowl Championship Series (BCS) system began in 1998. Before the BCS, polls in which coaches and/or sportswriters voted, such as the AP, UPI, and USA Today polls, awarded championships. This led to seasons in which two or more teams could claim to have won the national championship.

Since the 1930s, each top team has traditionally played a single postseason bowl game. The process of selecting a national champion during this time was complicated by the fact that the champions of major conferences were tied to specific bowls (for example, the Big 8 champion was tied to the Orange Bowl), and the top two teams in the nation often played in different bowls. A few bowls over the years featured a #1 vs. #2 matchup; one example was the 1987 Fiesta Bowl, played January 2 following the 1986 season.

Two attempts to annually crown a champion on the field were the Bowl Coalition (1992–94) and Bowl Alliance (1995-97). However, their effort to host a national championship was hampered by the lack of participation of the Pac-10 and Big Ten champions, who instead opted to play in the Rose Bowl.

The BCS was an improvement on the Bowl Coalition and Bowl Alliance because it included the Rose Bowl and the champions of what were then the nation's six most powerful conferences. It attempted to eliminate uncertainty by ranking college teams and inviting the top two teams at the end of the regular season to play in a championship game. These teams were determined by the BCS ranking formula, which itself used a combination of human voter polls and computer rankings. The process of selecting the two best teams for the BCS championship game had nonetheless resulted in controversy, which reached a head in 2003 when the AP poll refused to vote the BCS champions (LSU) as their national champions. Instead, the AP voted USC as national champions for the 2003 season. This resulted in disputes between which team was the real champion, and as a result, the 2003 BCS Champion is not unanimous. As a result of this controversy, the AP removed itself from the BCS formula in 2004. Furthermore, because of AP Poll policies, should a team under a postseason ban finish first in the AP Poll, the AP will recognise such team as the AP's national champion. The AP will also not recognise further penalties, which resulted in a vacated national championship in 2004 by most authorities but the AP still recognises USC (which was stripped by the NCAA of wins and the BCS committee of its championship) despite the Reggie Bush penalties.

Since the 2014 season, the College Football Playoff—in association with Division I FBS collegiate conferences and independent schools, along with six bowl games—has been played among the top four teams (as selected by a thirteen-member committee) to play two semifinal bowl games followed by a CFP National Championship Game between the semifinal winners. However, the panel has been criticised for failing to recognise champions of conferences outside the five major conferences for participation in the CFP or the New Year's Six games.

At lower levels of play in college football, mythical national champion crowns also continue to exist, separate from NCAA and NAIA championships, in the form of the black college football national championship. This is competed for by teams from historically black colleges and universities (HBCUs). In the present day, the winner of this crown at the NCAA Division I FCS level is generally considered to be the winner of the Celebration Bowl, DI FCS's only bowl game.

College basketball

The national championship of collegiate basketball that is officially recognized by the main governing body for collegiate athletics in the United States, the NCAA, has been awarded to the champion of an annual national post-season tournament run by the NCAA since 1939. Prior to the advent of national post-season college basketball tournaments, beginning with the NAIA national men's basketball championship in 1937, the National Invitation Tournament (NIT) in 1938 and the NCAA tournament in 1939, virtually no third-party organizations selected basketball national champions.

The Official NCAA Men's Basketball Records Book lists title selections of pre-tournament era teams by the Helms Athletic Foundation. The Helms Foundation's Bill Schroeder named a national champion from 1901 to 1982, with his selections from 1901 to 1941 being named retroactively in 1943 and 1957. The Helms champion, for the years in which the NIT and NCAA post-season tournaments were played, reflected the winners of the 1938 NIT and 1939 NIT, as well as the winners for all years of the NCAA Tournament except for 1939, 1940, 1944 and 1954. Most recently, the retroactive end-of-year Premo-Porretta Power Poll has provided the first national rankings of college basketball teams for the 1895–96 through the 1947–48 seasons. (No regular, recognized national polling took place prior to the establishment of the Associated Press Poll and the Coaches Poll for college basketball prior to the 1948–49 and 1950–51 seasons, respectively.) The Premo-Porretta rankings were published in 2009 in the ESPN College Basketball Encyclopedia. As with the Helms selections, the Premo-Porretta poll recognized the 1938 and 1939 NIT Champions as national champions; in addition to 1939, the poll's national championship selections differed from the results of the NCAA Tournament in 1941, 1943, 1944, 1945, and 1947.

During World War II, from 1943 to 1945, the NCAA, NIT and Madison Square Garden cooperated to host "mythical national championship games" between winners of each year's NCAA and NIT tournaments in order to benefit the American Red Cross' War Fund. The series was described by Ray Meyer, coach of the losing 1945 DePaul team, as "the games for the national championship". The NCAA champion prevailed in all three games.

During the early years of the two tournaments, the NCAA and NIT competed against each other, giving rise to debate over their relative prowess. In 1939, the inaugural year of the NCAA tournament, the NIT was generally considered to be superior. During the 1940s, the relative status of the two tournaments was unclear, and thus some years produced disputed national championship claims. Some contemporary sources claim superiority for the NIT during this time. In 1943, in a shrewd competitive move the NCAA tournament began sharing Madison Square Garden with the NIT. In 1945, following victories by the NCAA champions over the NIT champions in the Red Cross games, The New York Times indicated that many teams who could potentially get bids to enter either tournament would probably choose the NCAA tournament "because it involves stronger competition." In 1950, City College of New York won both the NIT and the NCAA tournaments in the same season, coincidentally defeating Bradley University in the championship game of both tournaments, and thus united the titles.

After the fall-out from the 1951 gambling and point-shaving scandals, the NCAA tournament pulled out of Madison Square Garden. With conference champions and the majority of the top-ranked teams participating in it, the NCAA tournament since then came to be regarded as the more important post-season tourney and the sole determiner of the national championship, although following the taint of the gambling scandals, the NIT was still considered a quality tournament for some time afterward. The NCAA built on the momentum of three consecutive Red Cross "mythical national championship" game victories over the NIT, eventually outmaneuvering the NIT by adeptly avoiding permanent damage from the 1951 gambling and point-shaving scandals and by adding more teams. As the NCAA Tournament steadily gained prominence, it became the sole source of naming the national champion.

Schools that claim pre-NCAA Tournament basketball championships
In some years college teams won playoff series or tournaments played on the court for a national championship, such as the annual AAU tournaments. In addition, many schools claim or recognize pre-tournament era national college basketball championships by virtue of being selected retrospectively by third-party selectors, such as Bill Schroeder at the Helms Athletic Foundation, including the University of Kansas, Purdue University, Stanford University, the University of North Carolina, the University of Pittsburgh, the University of Wisconsin, Syracuse University, and Washington State University. LSU claims the 1935 championship by virtue of winning the American Legion Bowl game against Pittsburgh in a match-up of regional powers.

Multiple schools claim a national championship based on their NIT championships: Temple (1938), Long Island (in 1939 and 1941), West Virginia (1942), DePaul (1945), Utah (1947), San Francisco (1949), BYU (1951 and 1966), La Salle (1952), Seton Hall (1953), Holy Cross (1954), Duquesne (1955), Louisville (1956), Xavier (1958), Providence (1961 and 1963), and Southern Illinois (1967). Long Island and Kentucky also recognize their selections as the 1939 and 1954 national champions by the Helms Foundation's Bill Schroeder during seasons that a different NCAA Champion was crowned.

The following table is a partial list of schools that claim a national championship from the pre-NCAA Tournament era of college basketball. See also Helms Athletic Foundation basketball national titles. Not all schools recognize national championship honors bestowed by third-party selectors, although almost every school with a team named as a Helms national champion claims the title for the selected seasons.

Tournament/playoff winners

Retrospective selections

Historically black colleges and universities

Black national basketball championships
In 1941, Southern University, coached by the famed football coach Ace Mumford, defeated North Carolina Central, 48–42, in the National Invitational Intercollegiate Basketball Tournament; this tournament was held because the NIT would not invite HBCUs at the time. NCCU was still designated national champions by the Associated Negro Press that year. There would be several other attempts at creating HBCU national tournaments in the 1940s. In late 1947, National Championships, Inc. announced that they would begin hosting a postseason football bowl game and basketball tournament for HBCUs; the basketball tournament does not appear to have been held. Jet magazine began sponsoring HBCU basketball polls in 1974. Dr. Cavil's Classic Cuts names champions for a "Major Division" (NCAA Division I) and a "Mid-Major Division" (NCAA Division II, NAIA Division I, and NAIA Division II).

The following table contains a list of men's black national champions.

Yearly national championship selections (men)

National championships by school (men)

The following table contains a list of women's black national champions.

Yearly national championship selections (women)

National championships by school (women)

Black national baseball championships

HBCUs first had a mythical black national champion named in 2002, by blackcollegebaseball.com. More recently, a black national champion has been named since 2015, by blackcollegenines.com. The latter names champions for a "Large School Division" (NCAA Division I) and a "Small School Division" (NCAA Division II, NCAA Division III, and the NAIA).

Yearly national championship selections

Note: *Alcorn State, St. Augustine's, and Stillman College are listed by a source as having been named black national champions by blackcollegebaseball.com, but the year(s) of the championships is not specified by the source; the year could be 2012, since champions were reportedly named that year

National championships by school

High school sports

Because high school sports in the United States such as football and basketball are state-centered sports involving thousands of schools, it would be almost impossible to have a national championship playoff. A single-game playoff for football, however, was attempted in 1938 and 1939, it was particularly difficult at that time due to many states' prohibition of postseason games. Nearly all states crown several champions in different classifications, which are not uniform from state to state, based upon school enrollments.

Some publications and internet sites release nationwide rankings for high school sports based on polls or mathematical formulas which take into account various factors like average margin of victory and strength of schedule. Schools that finish atop these rankings, particularly the USA Today poll, often claim to be national champions, and the press calls them "mythical national champions".

National Football League
In the earliest days of the National Football League, the NFL championship was determined by a formula and by the votes of the NFL owners. In three instances, 1920, 1921 and 1925, this led to disputed titles. In 1932, two teams tied atop the standings led to a one-game playoff for the championship, which was made permanent the next year. There has been some sort of NFL playoff ever since, and as the league grew, so too did the tournament, which eventually took form as the single-elimination tournament it is today.

References

College football championships
High school football in the United States
College men's basketball in the United States
College football controversies
College basketball controversies in the United States